Żelechlinek  is a village in Tomaszów Mazowiecki County, Łódź Voivodeship, in central Poland. It is the seat of the gmina (administrative district) called Gmina Żelechlinek.

References

Villages in Tomaszów Mazowiecki County
Piotrków Governorate
Łódź Voivodeship (1919–1939)